Balsam is the resinous exudate (or sap) which forms on certain kinds of trees and shrubs. Balsam (from Latin balsamum "gum of the balsam tree", ultimately from Semitic, Aramaic busma, Arabic balsam and Hebrew basam, "spice", "perfume") owes its name to the biblical Balm of Gilead.

Chemistry 
Balsam is a solution of plant-specific resins in plant-specific solvents (essential oils). Such resins can include resin acids, esters, or alcohols. The exudate is a mobile to highly viscous liquid and often contains crystallized resin particles. Over time and as a result of other influences the exudate loses its liquidizing components or gets chemically converted into a solid material (i.e. by autoxidation).

Some authors require balsams to contain benzoic or cinnamic acid or their esters. Plant resins are sometimes classified according to other plant constituents in the mixture, for example as:
 pure resins (guaiac, hashish), 
 gum-resins (containing gums/polysaccharides), 
 oleo-gum-resins (a mixture of gums, resins and essential oils), 
 oleo-resins (a mixture of resins and essential oils, e. g. capsicum, ginger and aspidinol), 
 balsams (resinous mixtures that contain cinnamic and/or benzoic acid or their esters), 
 glycoresins (podophyllin, jalap, kava kava),
 fossil resins (amber, asphaltite, Utah resin).

Usually, animal secretions (musk, shellac, beeswax) are excluded from this definition.

The Balsam of Matariyya 
The Balsam of Matariyya was a substance famous as a panacea among physicians in the Middle East and Europe during the Antique and Medieval periods. The substance has long been used as a medicine, with early references to the substance recorded as far back as 285 BC. The Balsam of Matariyya was said to be derived from an Egyptian plant and is sometimes also referred to as the balm of Gilead or the balm of Mecca.

List of balsams 
 Acaroid resin (Xanthorrhoea spp.)
 Acouchi balsam (Protium spp.)
 Ammoniacum
 Asafoetida (Laser)
 Balm of Gilead
 Balm of Mecca
 Balsam fir - (Abies balsamea)
 Balsam of Peru
 Balsam of Tolu
 Balsam Specific
 Bisabol
 Bdellium
 Benzoin resin
 Bukhoor
 Cabreuva balsam (Myrocarpus frondosus, Myrocarpus fastigatus)
 Camphor
 Canada balsam
 Chinese lacquer (Japanese lacquer)
 Copaiba balsam (Copaifera spp.)
 Copal
 Corneiba balsam (Schinus terebinthifolius or Lithraea brasiliensis)
 Damar
 Dragon's blood (Calamus draco)
 Elemi
 Frankincense (Olibanum)
 Galbanum
 Guayac (Guaiacum officinale)
 Guggul
 Gurjun balsam
 Imbauba balsam (Cecropia adenopus)
 Labdanum
 Mastic
 Myrrh
 Obira balsam (Apocynaceae)
 Opopanax
 Umiri balsam (Humiria floribunda)
 Rosin (Colophony)
 Sagapenum
 Sandarac
 Sarcocolla
 Storax balsam
 Turpentine
 Venice turpentine (Larch turpentine) (Larix occidentalis)
 Wallaba balsam (Eperua spp.)

Safety 
Some balsams, such as Balsam of Peru, may be associated with allergies. In particular, Euphorbia latex ("wolf's milk") is strongly irritant and is cytotoxic.

See also 
 Basamum

References 

Resins
Plant products